Siida is a museum located on Lake Inari in the village of Inari in Inari, Finland. It is home to the Sámi Museum and Northern Lapland Nature Centre. Siida arranges exhibitions on Sámi culture and the nature of Northern Lapland. In addition, Siida has an open-air museum open in the summers, which was originally known as the Inari Sámi Museum. The first buildings were moved to the museum grounds in 1960. The  area has nearly 50 sites of interest related to Lapland's nature and the Sámi and their culture. Furthermore, the area is where the earliest settlers in Northern Lapland lived and archaeological finds from approximately 9,000 years ago have been found.

External links

Siida

Inari, Finland
Open-air museums in Finland
Nature centers
Natural history museums in Finland
Museums in Lapland (Finland)
Sámi in Finland
Ethnic museums